Brampton East is a federal electoral district in Ontario. It encompasses a portion of Ontario previously included in the electoral districts of Bramalea—Gore—Malton and Brampton—Springdale.

Brampton East was created by the 2012 federal electoral boundaries redistribution and was legally defined in the 2013 representation order. It came into effect upon the call of the 42nd Canadian federal election.

Brampton East is the only federal electoral district with a South Asian majority (70.1% of the population identified as South Asian in 2021).  Brampton East also has the second-highest percentage of Sikhs (40.4%, behind only Surrey-Newton) and the highest percentage of Hindus (23.8%) of any riding in Canada. Brampton East has the lowest median age in Ontario at 32.6.

Demographics

According to the Canada 2021 Census

Ethnic groups: 70.1% South Asian, 10.2% Black, 6.6% White, 1.9% West Asian, 1.5% Filipino, 1.2% Latin American, 1.2% Southeast Asian, 1.1% Arab

Languages: 35.0% Punjabi, 31.4% English, 5.4% Gujarati, 3.6% Tamil, 3.0% Hindi, 2.1% Urdu, 1.0% Assyrian, 1.0% Italian

Religions: 40.4% Sikh, 23.8% Hindu, 22.3% Christian (10.4% Catholic, 1.9% Pentecostal, 10.0% Other), 7.4% Muslim, 4.9% None

Median income: $33,600 (2020)

Average income: $44,160 (2020)

Members of Parliament

This riding has elected the following Members of Parliament:

Election results

References

Ontario federal electoral districts
Politics of Brampton
2013 establishments in Ontario